Big Shot Comics was an American comic book series published  by Columbia Comics during period in the 1940s that fans and historians refer to as the Golden Age of comic books. An anthology title, the series included a mix of superheroes, costumed crimefighters, crusading district attorneys, heroic magicians and others, both in original stories and in reprinted newspaper comic strip  from the McNaught Syndicate, including Dixie Dugan, Joe Palooka, and the movie-series spin-off Charlie Chan.

Publication history 
Big Shot ran 104 issues, cover-dated May 1940 to August 1949. With issue #30 (Dec. 1942), the title was shortened to simply Big Shot.

Overview 
Original characters included The Face, Sparky Watts, Skyman, Brass Knuckles, Marvelo and Spy-Master.

Although the character Skyman was intended to be the leader of the title, the character did not have the star power that the publisher hoped for. Sparky Watts, a superhero parody character created by Boody Rogers, started in issue 14, and judging by the number of covers and solo books, had the highest popularity.

References
 

Comics magazines published in the United States
1940 comics debuts
1949 comics endings
Magazines established in 1940
Magazines disestablished in 1949
Golden Age comics titles